Ed Joyner (born c. 1945) was a Canadian football player who played for the Ottawa Rough Riders. He won the Grey Cup in 1968 and 1969. He previously played college football at Lenoir–Rhyne University.

References

1940s births
Ottawa Rough Riders players
Living people
Lenoir–Rhyne Bears football players
Canadian football linebackers
American players of Canadian football